Marilyn C. Brewer (born May 26, 1937) is a California politician who served from 1994 to 2000 as a California State Assemblywoman representing southern Orange County's 70th District.

Born in western Pennsylvania, Brewer earned her Associate's degree from Fullerton College in 1983. She served as an aide to Orange County supervisor Tom Riley until her election to the State Assembly.

In 1994 she ran for an open seat in the California State Assembly representing Newport Beach. Her two more conservative rivals in the GOP primary, Irvine city councilman Barry Hammond and attorney Tom Reinecke (son former California Lt. Gov. Ed Reinecke) split the conservative vote, allowing the more moderate Brewer to win the primary. In the general election she received 71.7% of the vote .

In the State Assembly, Brewer served as Vice Chair of the Appropriations and Insurance Committees. She was also a member of the Rules, Human Services, Transportation, Governmental Organization, and Labor/Employment committees.

She was reelected twice more in 1996(61.5%) & 1998 (95.7% with only opposition from a Natural Law Party candidate)  before California term limits of three terms in the State Assembly led to her leaving the state house in 2000.

In 2005 Brewer ran in a special election for California's 48th congressional district left vacant after incumbent Congressman Christopher Cox resigned to become Chairman of the U.S. Securities and Exchange Commission. Brewer lost the nomination to State Senator John Campbell by a 28% margin, but did beat eight other Republicans in the primary election.  Although she won the endorsement of John McCain, the Republican party chose to officially endorse Campbell after Brewer began to court independents and Democrats.  The American Independent Party candidate, Minuteman Project founder Jim Gilchrist, fell only 2.3% short of overtaking Brewer in the open primary.

In October 2006, California Governor Arnold Schwarzenegger appointed Brewer to serve as a member of the "Little Hoover Commission".

See also
2005 California's 48th congressional district special election

References

External links
Official Brewer for Congress web site
Join California Marilyn Brewer

1937 births
Living people
Republican Party members of the California State Assembly
People from Orange County, California
People from Monessen, Pennsylvania
Women state legislators in California
20th-century American politicians
20th-century American women
21st-century American women
20th-century American women politicians